The economy of Abkhazia is heavily integrated with the economy of Russia and uses the Russian ruble as its currency.

Abkhazia has experienced a modest economic upswing since the 2008 South Ossetia war and Russia's subsequent recognition of Abkhazia's independence. In 2011, about half of Abkhazia's state budget was financed with aid money from Russia.
In 2021 43.6% of Abkhazia's state budget was financed by aid money from Russia, while 56.4% of the budget came from local income.

Tourism

Tourism is a key industry and, according to Abkhazian authorities, almost a million tourists (mainly from Russia) came to Abkhazia in 2007. Since Abkhazia and Russia have signed a visa-free travel agreement, Russian passport-holders do not require a visa to enter Abkhazia. Holders of European Union passports require an Entry Permit Letter issued by the Ministry of Foreign Affairs in Sukhumi, against which a visa will be issued upon presentation of the Letter to the Ministry.

Transport 

Abkhazian railway is a rail operator in Abkhazia. Under a monopoly agreement, it is fully managed and partially owned by Russian Railways for a ten year contract from 2009-2019. In 2016, 307,748 people traveled between Abkhazia and Russia by rail. There is also the New Athos Cave Railway, an underground electric railroad serving the New Athos Cave in the town of New Athos.

Agriculture 
Abkhazia's fertile land and abundance of agricultural products, including tea, tobacco, wine and fruits (especially tangerines), have secured a relative stability in the sector.

Electricity generation

Electricity is largely supplied by the Inguri hydroelectric power station located on the Inguri River between Abkhazia and Georgia proper and operated jointly by Abkhaz and Georgians.

Trade 
The exports and imports in 2006 were 627.2 and 3,270.2 million rubles respectively (appx. 22 and 117 million. US dollars) according to the Abkhazian authorities.

In July 2012, the State Customs Committee for the first time published trade statistics. It reported that in the first half of 2012, imports had been worth 6.748 and exports 1.48 billion ruble, resulting in a 4.6518 billion ruble trade deficit. At the same time, while imports had stayed virtually the same (decreasing by 0.2%), exports had risen by 25.8%. Abkhazia's main trading partners were Russia (64%), Turkey (18%), the Baltic states (5%), Moldova (2%), Germany (2%), Ukraine (1%) and China (1%).

Foreign investment 
Many Russian entrepreneurs and some Russian municipalities have invested or plan to invest in Abkhazia. This includes the Moscow municipality after the former Mayor of Moscow, Yury Luzhkov (in office 1992–2010), signed an agreement on economic cooperation between Moscow and Abkhazia.
Both Abkhazian and Russian officials announced intentions to exploit Abkhazia's facilities and resources for the Olympic construction projects in Sochi in the run-up to that city hosting the 2014 Winter Olympics. The government of Georgia warned against such actions, however, and threatened to ask foreign banks to close the accounts of Russian companies and of individuals buying assets in Abkhazia.

The CIS economic sanctions imposed on Abkhazia in 1996 formally remain in force, although Russia announced on 6 March 2008 that it would no longer participate in them, declaring them "outdated, impeding the socio-economic development of the region, and causing unjustified hardship for the people of Abkhazia". Russia also called on other CIS members to undertake similar steps, but met with protests from Tbilisi and with lack of support from the other CIS countries.

The European Union has allocated more than €20 million to Abkhazia since 1997 for various humanitarian projects, including the support of civil society, economic rehabilitation, help to the most vulnerable households and confidence-building measures. The EU's single largest  project involves the repair and reconstruction of the Inguri power station.

In April 2011, the government of Georgia summoned the Israeli ambassador for clarifications over an Israeli visit to Abkhazia and AP reported that the Israeli ambassador officially denied that Israel would provide arms to Abkhazia.

Corruption

According to a 2007 report by US-based organisation Freedom House, the region continues to suffer considerable economic problems owing to widespread corruption, the control by criminal organisations of large segments of the economy, and the continuing effects of the war.

References

 

Abkhazia